= Bengtsår =

Island in Hanko, Finland

Coordinates: 59°54′26.19″N 23°6′46.81″E

Bengtsår is an island in the municipality of Hanko, Finland. It is mainly used by the city of Helsinki to hold annual summer camps for children.
